Omaswati, or Omas, (3 May 1966 – 16 July 2020) was an Indonesian television actress and comedian, also known as a performer of lenong, a theatrical form of the Betawi people.

Career 

She began her career performing traditional Betawi lenong. She became nationally known through her frequent television appearances, using her signature frankly spoken comedic style as a character actor in sinetrons as well as in comedy programs and talk shows.

Personal life and death 

Omas was born in Jakarta to local parents. She was the sister of popular Indonesian comedians and also lenong performers Mandra and Mastur. All three were inspired to enter the theater by their older siblings who had done so before them.

Omas died on 16 July 2020, in Depok. The cause of death was lung disease, from which she had been suffering for some months and for which she had been hospitalized repeatedly. She left three children, Muhammad Rizky Dioambiah, Dinda Olivia, and Dimas Aji Septian.

TV series

Television programs
 ASAL (Asli Atau Palsu) -  TRANS 7

References

External links 
 

Indonesian women comedians
Indonesian comedians
Indonesian actresses
1966 births
2020 deaths
Betawi people